The Faculty of Dentistry of the Royal College of Surgeons in Ireland was founded in 1963 with the core mission of advancing the science, art and practice of dentistry by the promotion of education, study and research.

The Faculty is responsible for setting standards of postgraduate training in both Ireland and other centres around the world.

The Faculty has more than 2000 Fellows and Members throughout the world.

See also
Faculty of Dental Surgery
Royal College of Surgeons in Ireland

Sources

External links
RCSI Website
RCSI Library collections

Royal College of Surgeons in Ireland
Medical associations based in Ireland
1963 establishments in Ireland